Lindsey Russell (born 25 September 1990) is a British television presenter. She is best known for being the thirty-sixth presenter of the long running British BBC television programme Blue Peter, which she co-hosted from 2013 to 2021 with Barney Harwood, Radzi Chinyanganya, Helen Skelton, Richie Driss, Mwaksy Mudenda and Adam Beales.

Career 
Russell was successful in a competition to find the next presenter for Blue Peter that attracted 20,000 applicants and was judged by a panel that included TV presenters Eamonn Holmes and Myleene Klass. She won the role shortly after graduating from the University of Bristol after a four-year French and drama course.

In 2016 Russell attempted to cross the 21 miles between Northern Ireland and Scotland in a three-metre zorb in aid of Sport Relief. She had to abort the attempt due to bad weather. She left Blue Peter on 15 July 2021, breaking a world record for the fastest time to dress in cricket whites on her last show.

It was announced on 16 December 2021 that Russell would join Heart Radio in January 2022 to present Saturdays and Sundays from 1am to 6am.

Filmography

References

External links

Living people
1990 births
English television presenters
People from Oxford
Blue Peter presenters
Alumni of the University of Bristol